In graph theory, the tensor product   of graphs  and  is a graph such that
 vertices  and {{math|(''g,h' )}} are adjacent in  if and only if 

The tensor product is also called the direct product, Kronecker product, categorical product, cardinal product, relational product, weak direct product, or conjunction'''. As an operation on binary relations, the tensor product was introduced by Alfred North Whitehead and Bertrand Russell in their Principia Mathematica (1912). It is also equivalent to the Kronecker product of the adjacency matrices of the graphs.

The notation  is also (and formerly normally was) used to represent another construction known as the Cartesian product of graphs, but nowadays more commonly refers to the tensor product. The cross symbol shows visually the two edges resulting from the tensor product of two edges. This product should not be confused with the strong product of graphs.

Examples
The bipartite double cover of the Petersen graph is the Desargues graph: . The bipartite double cover of a complete graph  is a crown graph (a complete bipartite graph  minus a perfect matching).
 The tensor product of a complete graph with itself is the complement of a Rook's graph. Its vertices can be placed in an  grid, so that each vertex is adjacent to the vertices that are not in the same row or column of the grid.

Properties
The tensor product is the category-theoretic product in the category of graphs and graph homomorphisms. In particular, a graph  admits a homomorphism into  if and only if it admits a homomorphism into  and into .

To see that, in one direction, observe that a pair of homomorphisms  and  yields a homomorphism

In the other direction, a homomorphism  can be composed with the projections homomorphisms

If a graph can be represented as a tensor product, then there may be multiple different representations (tensor products do not satisfy unique factorization) but each representation has the same number of irreducible factors.  gives a polynomial time algorithm for recognizing tensor product graphs and finding a factorization of any such graph.

The tensor product of graphs equips the category of graphs and graph homomorphisms with the structure of a symmetric closed monoidal category. Let  denote the underlying set of vertices of the graph .

See also 
 Graph product
 Strong product of graphs

Notes

References 
.
.

External links

Graph products
Alfred North Whitehead
Bertrand Russell